Sir Arthur William Blomfield  (6 March 182930 October 1899) was an English architect. He became president of the Architectural Association in 1861; a Fellow of the Royal Institute of British Architects in 1867 and vice-president of the RIBA in 1886. He was educated at Trinity College, Cambridge, where he read Architecture.

Background
He was the ninth son of Charles James Blomfield, Anglican Bishop of London, who began a programme of new church construction in the capital. Born in Fulham Palace, Arthur Blomfield was educated at Rugby and Trinity College, Cambridge. He was then articled as an architect to Philip Charles Hardwick, and subsequently obtained a large practice on his own account.

The young Thomas Hardy joined Blomfield's practice as assistant architect in April 1862, and the writer remained friends with Blomfield. He became president of the Architectural Association in 1861; a Fellow of the Royal Institute of British Architects in 1867 (proposed by George Gilbert Scott, H. Brandon and J. P. Seddon); and vice-president of the RIBA in 1886. In 1889, he was knighted. He was awarded the Royal Gold Medal in 1891.

He was twice married. His first wife was Caroline Harriet Smith (1840-1882) and his second wife, Lady Blomfield, was an author and humanitarian. Two of his daughters, Mary Esther and Ellinor Blomfield, were supporters of the suffragette movement and famously made a representation to the King. Two of his sons, Charles James and Arthur Conran Blomfield, were brought up to his own profession, and of which they became distinguished representatives. His nephew, Sir Reginald Blomfield, apprenticed under him, went on to design numerous buildings, public works, and sculpture, including the Cross of Sacrifice or War Cross, for the Commonwealth War Graves Commission. These are in Commonwealth cemeteries in many countries.

He died at the Royal Society in London on 30 October 1899 aged 70 and was buried on 3 November in Broadway, Worcestershire, where he lived at Springfield House.

Major works

In 1882 Blomfield designed the Royal College of Music in London. In 1887 he became architect to the Bank of England and, in association with Arthur Edmund Street, designed the Law Courts branch of the Bank of England in Fleet Street. A. E. Street was the son of the architect G. E. Street.

In 1890–7 he rebuilt the nave of St. Saviour's parish church, Southwark (now Southwark Cathedral), replacing an earlier reconstruction of 1839–40. It is a notable example of his use of a Gothic Revival style. He was highly regarded as a restorer; a spokesman for the Society for the Protection of Ancient Buildings said of his 1898 restoration of Salisbury Cathedral spire "conducted in the most conservative way possible ... I am confident that anyone who had been privileged to see the work that is being done ... would not withhold his subscriptions even though he was as ardent an anti-restorer as your obedient servant."

In 1899 he completed St. George's Anglican Cathedral in Georgetown, Guyana, which was the tallest wooden church in the world until 2003 when the Peri Monastery near Săpânţa in northern Romania was completed.

Other works (in chronological order)
Grove Gardens Chapel, Richmond, Surrey, c.1875
St Leonard's Church, Linley, Shropshire, restoration, 1858
Christ Church, Crouch End 1862
Christ Church, East Sheen 1863
St Mary's parish church, Jackfield, Shropshire, 1863
All Saints' parish church, Windsor, Berkshire, 1862–64
St Luke's chapel at the former Radcliffe Infirmary, Oxford, 1864
St Mary's Church, Banbury, Oxfordshire: restoration 1864
Dartford Grammar School, Kent, 1864.
St. Mary's parish church, Adwell, Oxfordshire, 1865
St Mark's parish church, Binfield, Berkshire, 1866
St Mary's parish church, Princes Risborough, Buckinghamshire, 1867–68
St John the Baptist parish church, Eton Wick, Buckinghamshire, 1867–69
All Saints' parish church, Upper Caldecote, Bedfordshire, 1868
St. Mary's Church, Strood, Kent, 1868
Vicarage House for Holy Trinity Church, Headington Quarry, Oxfordshire, 1868
St Saviour's parish church, Eddington, Berkshire, 1868
St Mary Magdalen Church, Sheet, Hampshire, 1868–69
St. Barnabas parish church, Jericho, Oxford, 1869
St Peter in Eastgate, Lincoln 1870
St Stephen's Church, Tunbridge Wells, Kent, 1870 (demolished in 1889 and replaced by St. Barnabas' Church on the same site)
All Saints' parish church, Neenton, Shropshire, 1870–71
St Saviour's Church, Oxford Street, London 1870–73
St John the Baptist, Bathwick, Bath, 1871
St Mary-at-the-Walls, Colchester, 1872
St Nicholas' Church, Chawton 1872–73
St James' parish church, Ramsden, Oxfordshire, 1872
Church of St Mary and St Ethelbert, Luckington, Wiltshire, 1872<
St. Andrew's parish church, Surbiton, Surrey 1872
St John the Baptist parish church, Crowthorne, Berkshire, 1873
Holy Innocents parish church, High Beach, Essex, 1873
Tyntesfield chapel, Wraxall, Somerset, 1873
St Peter's Church, Netherseal, Derbyshire 1874 
St Michael and All Angels Church, Hughenden, Buckinghamshire, 1874–90
St John the Baptist's Church, Eltham, Kent, 1875
St Michael and All Angels Church, Maidstone, Kent, 1876
Chapel Royal, Brighton, internal structural repairs and reordering 1876; new exterior 1896
Christ Church, Epsom, Surrey, 1876
Holy Innocents, Hornsey, London N8, 1876–7
Holy Trinity Church, Privett, 1876–78
Haileybury and Imperial Service College Chapel, 1877
St Andrew's Church, Collingbourne Ducis, Wiltshire: restoration, 1877
All Saints' parish church, Roffey, West Sussex, 1878
St. Mary Magdalene parish church, Woodstock, Oxfordshire: restoration, 1878
Trinity College, Cambridge Bishop's Hostel additions 1878
St Paul's Church, Clapham: East end extension, 1879 

Denton Hall, Denton, Lincolnshire, rebuilt 1879–1883
All Saints Church, Fulham, 1880–81
St Nicholas' parish church, Heythrop, Oxfordshire, 1880
St John the Evangelist's Church, St Leonards-on-Sea, East Sussex (1881; partly destroyed by bombing in 1943 and rebuilt by Harry Stuart Goodhart-Rendel)
Selwyn College, Cambridge, 1882
Chester Cathedral restoration and additions, 1882
St Andrew's Church, Worthing, West Sussex (1882)
St Luke's Church, Queen's Park, Brighton, Sussex, 1882–85
St Stephen's Church, North Mundham, West Sussex: addition of chancel and re-ordering of interior, 1883
St Andrew, Stoke Newington, 1883–4
Charterhouse School, the Great Hall 1884
St Leodegar's Church, Hunston, Sussex, 1885
St. Wystan's Church, Repton restoration 1885–1886
Wellington College, Berkshire: chapel apse and dormitories, 1886
St. Alban's Anglican Church, Copenhagen, Denmark
St Germanus' Church, Faulkbourne, Essex, 1886
St Andrew's Church, Leytonstone, Essex 1886–93.
Royal Memorial Church of St George, Cannes, 1886–92
St Mary's Church, Walmer, Kent, 1887
Minster Church of St Denys, Warminster, Wiltshire: rebuilding 1887–89
St David's Church Bangor, Gwynedd, 1888
St Mary's Church, Rostherne, Cheshire, 1888
All Saints' Church, Leatherhead, Surrey, 1888
St Mark's Church, Regent's Park, 1888-9 (alterations)
St Mark's parish church, Bourne End, Buckinghamshire, 1889
Bancroft's School, Woodford Green, Essex, 1889
St Stephen's Church, Brighton, additions 1889
Eton College, Buckinghamshire: Lower Chapel and Queen's Schools, 1889–91
All Souls Church, Hastings, Sussex, 1890
All Saints' Blackheath, additions in 1890 (vestries) and 1899 (porch)
St Cyprian's Church, Brockley, London, 1890
St James' Church, West End, Hampshire 1890
Christ Church Cathedral (Falkland Islands), 1890–1892
Oxford House, Bethnal Green, London, 1891
St Mary's parish church, Liss, Hampshire 1892
Magdalen College School, Oxford, 1893–94
West Sussex County Asylum, Chichester, West Sussex, 1894–97
The Catholic Church of Our Lady and St Edward the Confessor, Lyndhurst, Hants, 1894–96
Epsom College Chapel, Surrey 1895
St Werburgh's Church, Derby, new church added, 1895
St Mary's Church, Swansea, Glamorgan, 1896
St Michael's Church, Macclesfield, Cheshire, new nave and aisles, 1898–1901
All Saints Church, Leamington Spa, two western bays to the nave and a south western bell tower, 1898–1902
Wellington College, Berkshire, chapel aisles, 1899
St Saviour's Church of Ireland parish church, Coolgreaney Road, Arklow, County Wicklow, 1899
Glenesk Mausoleum, East Finchley Cemetery, Barnet, 1899

As Sir A.W. Blomfield and Sons
St John the Evangelist's Church, Preston Village, Brighton, Sussex, 1901
St George's Church, Ashtead, Surrey, 1905
St Saviour's Church, Raynes Park, Surrey, 1905
St Michael's parish church, Abbey Wood, Kent, 1907
Sea Marge Hotel in Overstrand, Norfolk, private residence for Sir Edgar Speyer, 1908
Church of Holy Trinity, Eltham, London, 1908
St Mellitus Church, Hanwell, 1909

References

Sources

External links 
 Profile on Royal Academy of Arts Collections

1829 births
1899 deaths
People educated at Rugby School
Alumni of Trinity College, Cambridge
Architects from London
Gothic Revival architects
English ecclesiastical architects
Recipients of the Royal Gold Medal
Architects of cathedrals
Knights Bachelor
Fellows of the Royal Institute of British Architects
People from Fulham
19th-century English architects
Associates of the Royal Academy